The Collector (Sakupljač - original title), is the first Serbian science fiction television series. The first five episodes were produced and broadcast by Studio B in December 2005, and the other episodes were broadcast during 2006. The Collector is based on a story of Zoran Živković who won the World Fantasy Award. All episodes are directed by Marko Kamenica.

The episodes can be watched separately, but together they form a coherent story arc, which is linked together by The Collector, played by Petar Kralj. Aside from The Collector there is another character, a different one every episode, who changes his passion for collecting: memory, hope, autographs of dying people, etc.  The series is made using minimal special effects, but in the style of The Twilight Zone.

Cast
Petar Kralj
Dubravko Jovanović
Dragomir Čumić
Vladan Dujović
Branislav Ciga Jerinić
Milan Mihailovic
Srdjan Ivanovic

External links 
 
 
 

Science fiction anthology television series
2005 Serbian television series debuts
2006 Serbian television series endings
Serbian drama television series
Serbian-language television shows
Television shows set in Serbia
Television shows filmed in Serbia
RTV Studio B original programming